CareStar, Inc. (CareStar) is a private, Ohio-based healthcare corporation which provides home and community-based case management services in government, agency and residential operations. CareStar is one of the contracted case management agencies for the Ohio Home Care Waiver Program  and HOME Choice through the Ohio Department of Medicaid (ODM). CareStar spends about $2 million a year on health benefits for more than 300 employees and their families. Based on Better Business Bureau (BBB) files comparing multiple criteria in several categories, CareStar has a BBB Rating of A+ on a scale from A+ to F.

History 
CareStar has provided case management services since 1988 in various mid-western states, predominantly in Ohio and Indiana. In 2004, CareStar signed a five-year, $140 million contract with the Ohio Department of Job and Family Services to provide case management services for its medicaid waiver homecare program. The contract had been renewed multiple times, most recently on June 4, 2009 when it was extended through June, 2011. 
In a news release, CareStar said it will become the sole statewide provider of home health case management services, overseeing about 11,000 consumers. Starting in 2016, it will just be 1 of 2 choices for the oversight of the Ohio Waiver program under the auspices of Jobs & Family Services. It also will manage a network of more than 6,500 care providers. This number will change with the choice of oversight companies in 2016. The Indiana Home and Hospice Care Foundation is partnered with CareStar Learning (CareStar business venture which offers continuing education for providers) to provide the online testing for its Caregiver Train-the-Trainer program.

CareStar is an ongoing sponsor of the Ms. Wheel Chair USA Competition, an event which supports greater independence for those challenged with disabilities. On June 6, 2011 CareStar was recognized for its contributing role in the national award presented by the U.S. Office of Inspector General’s (OIG) Medicaid Fraud Policy and Oversight Division, within the Department of Health and Human Services. The award, given annually, honors various contributions in the prevention of Medicaid fraud and this year's winner of the State Medicaid Fraud Control Award for federal fiscal year 2010 was awarded to Ohio’s Medicaid Fraud Control Unit (MFCU). This award was created to highlight significant successes in the investigation and recovery of fraudulently obtained Medicaid dollars which totalled $103.8 according to Ohio's Attorney General Mike DeWine. Attorney General DeWine and select members of his staff attended the OIG Awards Ceremony on June 6, 2011 in Washington, D.C. in order to accept the award on behalf of all Ohio MCFU partners.

CareStar case managers and the Ohio HOME Choice program's providers aim to identify individuals who need person-centered assistance moving into settings that are more suitable to their preferences and needs. Their service provision is designed to help individuals move from qualified institutional setting into their communities by understanding individuals' needs, preferences and barriers to Ohio's long-term care (LTC) system. The following HOME Choice News Bulletins feature success stories written by CareStar employees:

- Summer 2012

- Winter 2013

- Spring 2013

In the Fall 2011 Issue of the Ohio HOME Choice Newsletter, CareStar received special recognition as a contributor to the Ohio HOME Choice program and continuing its mission to better serve those in need of housing in the State of Ohio.

In August 2011, CareStar was officially nominated by the Better Business Bureau (BBB) of Cincinnati, Ohio as a finalist in the annual presentation of the Torch Award. The Torch Award is a yearly award given to its member companies who act and work in an ethical manner throughout their entire operation. CareStar is one of 11 companies to be nominated in 2011 and the winners will be announced in October 2011.

References 

Health care companies based in Ohio